Brad Shepik, also known as Brad Schoeppach (born February 13, 1966, Walla Walla, Washington) is an American jazz guitarist. He also plays the saz and tambura.

Born Brad Schoeppach, he changed his last name to Shepik in the late 1990s. He played saxophone as a youth but switched to guitar as a teenager. He attended Cornish College of the Arts, graduating with a bachelor's degree in 1988. In the 1990s he led his own ensembles with sidemen including Jim Black, Peter Epstein, Tony Scherr, Chris Speed, Skúli Sverrisson, and Kenny Wollesen. He has worked extensively as a sideman with Paul Motian, Dave Douglas, Matt Darriau, Charlie Haden, Carla Bley, and Yuri Yunakov.

References

"Brad Shepik". The New Grove Dictionary of Jazz. 2nd edition, ed. Barry Kernfeld.

American jazz guitarists
Guitarists from Washington (state)
American male guitarists
1966 births
Living people
20th-century American guitarists
20th-century American male musicians
American male jazz musicians